Presidential elections were held in Georgia on January 4, 2004. The election followed the resignation of former President Eduard Shevardnadze. As expected, the main opposition leader, Mikhail Saakashvili, was soon shown by exit polls to be heading for an overwhelming victory. According to preliminary results issued on January 6 by the Central Election Commission, Saakashvili won over 97% of the votes cast.

The other candidates received less than 2% each. They were former presidential envoy to the Imereti region Temur Shashiashvili, leader of the Lawyers of Georgia Party Kartlos Garibashvili, one of the leaders of the political organization Mdzleveli, Zurab Kelekhsashvili, the President of the Coalition of Non-Government Organisations of the Disabled Zaza Sikharulidze, and leader of the David Agmashenebeli Party Roin Liparteliani.

Results
Early on 5 January Saakashvili claimed victory, although no official figures had been released at that time. He thanked his supporters, who were gathered in the Philharmonic Hall in Tbilisi, and also thanked the voters. "The whole of Georgia has won," he said.

"The primary tasks to be implemented from the first days of my presidency include introduction of a Prime Minister's post, appointment of a date for parliamentary elections and implementation of anti-corruption measures in the country," Saakashvili said.

Aftermath
Saakashvili was inaugurated as President in Tbilisi on January 25.

References

Presidential elections in Georgia (country)
Rose Revolution
Presidential election
Georgia
Georgia